Merenje is a naselje (settlement) in the town of Zaprešić, Zagreb County, Croatia. This makes it the smallest settlement by area in Zaprešić.

References 

Populated places in Zagreb County
Zaprešić